JS Abukuma (DE-229) is the lead ship of the s. She was commissioned on 12 December 1989.

Construction and career
Abukuma was laid down at Mitsui Engineering & Shipbuilding Tamano Shipyard on 17 March 1988 and launched on 21 December 1988. She was commissioned on 12 December 1989 and deployed to Maizuru.

The Royal Australian Navy destroyer  and frigate , which called at Maizuru from 29 October to 3 November 1993, were hosted by the escort ship  and Abukuma.

A suspicious ship off was spotted off the Noto Peninsula on 23 March 1999.

The destroyer escort joined Maizuru District Force 24th Escort Corps on 6 November 2003. On 26 March 2008, the 24th escort was renamed to the 14th escort due to a major reorganization of the Self-Defense Fleet, and was reorganized under the escort fleet.

On 6 July 2009, Japan-Korea rescue joint training was held in the Sea of Japan, and Abukuma participated with the escort ship  and three P-3C patrol aircraft, and the Republic of Korea Navy destroyer .

On 15 March 2010, the escort fleet was transferred to the 12th escort corps due to reorganization, and the homeport was transferred from Maizuru to Kure. Abukuma was among the naval forces dispatched to aid inhabitants of Japan after the 2011 Great East Japan Earthquake off the Pacific coast on 11 March 2011.

Gallery

Citations

External links

1988 ships
Abukuma-class destroyer escorts
Ships built by Mitsui Engineering and Shipbuilding